Svetlen is a village in Kirkovo Municipality, Kardzhali Province, southern Bulgaria. The local football club is Belomorets Svetlen.

References

Villages in Kardzhali Province